"Kissing with Confidence" is a song by Will Powers (the stage name/persona of photographer-turned-singer Lynn Goldsmith) from her 1983 album Dancing for Mental Health. It was written by Goldsmith, Jacob Brackman, Nile Rodgers, Todd Rundgren, and Steve Winwood. Goldsmith used a voice recorder to sound like a man. Carly Simon is the uncredited lead singer.

Mixed by Rundgren, it was released as a single in the UK, peaking at No. 17 on the UK Singles Chart. It also peaked at No. 50 in Australia.

Track listings and formats 
7" single
"Kissing With Confidence" – 3:54
"All Thru History" – 4:08

12" single
"Kissing With Confidence" (Extended Version) – 5:31
"Kissing With Confidence (Dub Version)" – 6:40

Credits
 T. Bailey	- Composer
 Jacob Brackman - Composer
 Lynn Goldsmith - Composer, Producer, Vocals
 Will Powers - Primary Artist
 Nile Rodgers - Composer
 Terry Rundgren - Composer
 Todd Rundgren - Mixing
 Carly Simon - Vocals
 Steven Stanley - Mixing
 Steve Winwood - Composer

Charts

References

External links
 Lynn Goldsmith's Official Website
 Carly Simon's Official Website
 YouTube - Kissing With Confidence (Official Music Video)

1983 singles
1983 songs
Carly Simon songs
Songs written by Steve Winwood
Songs written by Nile Rodgers
Songs written by Todd Rundgren
Songs written by Jacob Brackman